The 2019 Canada Winter Games, officially known as the XXVII Canada Games, is a Canadian multi-sport event that was held in Red Deer, Alberta, from February 15, 2019, to March 3, 2019. These were the third Canada Winter Games held in the province of Alberta, after the 1975 Canada Winter Games in Lethbridge and the 1995 Canada Winter Games in Grande Prairie.

Host selection
On September 4, 2014, it was announced that Red Deer had won its bid to host the games by beating Lethbridge.

Venues
13 competition venues located in Red Deer, Calgary and Kananaskis were used.

Red Deer
Canyon Ski Resort – Alpine skiing, freestyle skiing, snowboarding
Centrium – hockey
Collicutt Centre – gymnastics, ringette 
"Downtown Arena" – hockey, ringette 
Gary W. Harris Canada Games Centre – badminton, figure skating, short track speed skating, squash, wheelchair basketball
Great Chief Park – speed skating 
Kinex Arena – hockey 
Pidherney Centre – curling
River Ben Golf & Recreation Area – biathlon, cross-country skiing 
Westerner Park – archery, boxing, judo, table tennis

Calgary
Repsol Sport Centre – artistic swimming
WinSport's Canada Olympic Park – freestyle skiing, snowboarding

Kananaskis
Nakiska Ski Resort – Alpine skiing

Sports
164 medals events in 19 sports were contested. Note, ski cross is included in the alpine ski program.

 
 
 
 
 
 
 
 
 
 
 
 Artistic gymnastics (14)
 Trampoline (5)

Participating Provinces/Territories
All 13 of Canada's provinces and territories competed. The number of competitors each province or territory entered is in brackets.

 (247) (hosts)
 (251)
 (208)
 (201)
 (157)
 (93)
 (211)
 (43)
 (250)
 (155)
 (243)
 (215)
 (109)

Schedule
The competition was held over 16 days, with Saturday the 23rd being the transition day (no events held).

Medal table
The following is the medal table.

Two silvers were awarded in the men's individual all-around gymnastics event.

References

External links
Official website 

 
Canada Games
Canada Winter Games
Canada Winter Games
Canada Winter Games
Sports competitions in Red Deer, Alberta
2019 in Canadian sports
2019 in Alberta